Anaplastology (Gk. ana-again, anew, upon plastos-something made, formed, molded logy-the study of) is a branch of medicine dealing with the prosthetic rehabilitation of an absent, disfigured or malformed anatomically critical location of the face or body. The term anaplastology was coined by Walter G. Spohn and is used worldwide.

An anaplastologist (also known as a maxillofacial prosthetist and technologist in the UK) is an individual who has the knowledge and skill set to provide the service of customizing a facial (craniofacial prosthesis), ocular or somatic prosthesis. In locations around the world where facial, ocular and somatic prostheses are not readily available, a dentist who specializes in maxillofacial prosthetics (prosthodontics), or a dental technician or an ocularist, may also be titled an anaplastologist. In urban or more developed locations, an individual referred to as an anaplastologist is one who solely works with facial, ocular or somatic prostheses. In such a setting, there are times the anaplastologist collaborates with prosthodontists and ocularists.

The studies of an anaplastologist consist of the arts and sciences.  Visual arts are studied, namely photography, illustration, sculpture, and painting.  Biology, behavioral sciences, materials science, and physics are the studied sciences with emphases in superficial anatomy and physiology of humans, polymer science, optics, dermatology, oral and maxillofacial surgery, otolaryngology, and oncology to name a few.

Certification in the field of anaplastology is provided by the Board for Certification in Clinical Anaplastology (BCCA). Professionals certified by the BCCA are designated as Certified Clinical Anaplastologists and denote their credential with the CCA title.

History 
In the Battle of the Somme, an estimated 4,000,000 shots were fired, causing 20,000 facial injuries. Individuals whose injuries were unable to be treated with plastic surgery or reconstructive surgery techniques available to them at the time were given the option of wearing customized pieces to restore the natural appearance of their face. These pieces were crafted by sculptors. A notable sculptor who created prosthetic pieces for victims of war was Anna Coleman Ladd, a member of the Red Cross who made casts of her patients' faces and then, by hand, would create pieces out of galvanized copper, tin foil, and human hair for them to wear. Ladd's pieces were secured with bands around the head, which were often concealed by false eyeglasses.

In 1980 Walter G. Spohn and a group of like-minded colleagues founded the American Anaplastology Association (AAA) at Stanford University, in Palo Alto, California.

In the media 
In the 1986 musical, Andrew Lloyd Weber's The Phantom of the Opera, the character Erik wears a facial mask to hide his facial deformities.

In the 2004 film, The Libertine, John Wilmot, 2nd Earl of Rochester, as portrayed by American actor Johnny Depp is shown to wear a facial mask to cover the sores on his face caused by syphilis.

In the 2010 television show Boardwalk Empire, the character Richard Harrow wears a tin mask with glasses to hide the disfigurement of his face he endured during his service as a soldier in World War I.

References

External links
 International Anaplastology Association
 Board for Certification in Clinical Anaplastology

Plastic surgery
Rehabilitation medicine